Pangseng is an Adamawa language of Taraba State, Nigeria. It is spoken in Jinlàri (Jimleri), located on the Zing-Lankaviri road.  Varieties include Komo, Jega, and others.

References

Languages of Nigeria
Mumuye–Yendang languages